Emil Torday (22 June 1875 in Budapest, Hungary – 9 May 1931 in London, England), was a Hungarian anthropologist. He was the father of the romance novelist Ursula Torday.

Biography
Emil Torday was born on 22 June 1875 in Budapest, Hungary. He studied at the University of Munich, but without completing his degree started to work at a Brussels Bank.

During his stay in the Congo, he developed his interest in anthropology. After his return to Europe, he met Thomas Athol Joyce, who worked at British Museum. In 1907, he undertook an expedition on behalf of the British Museum in the Kwango River Basin in the Belgian Congo, when he amassed a collection of 3000 objects from the Kuba Kingdom for the museum. The expedition also known as Torday-Hilton-Simpson expedition produced a large collection of photos depicting every day life in villages of the Congo Basin. Photos from his expedition are held at the Museum Of Ethnography in Budapest. Other outstanding pieces of the collection are three royal Ndop figures he collected. 

Torday also recorded folk songs by gramophone on his successive journeys to West Africa. He spoke eight local languages. 

The centre point of Torday's ethnographic work was his engagement with the Kuba peoples in the Kuba Kingdom, and especially his relationship with the nyimi (king) KotaPe (or Kwete in Torday's spelling). Always an advocate of indigenous views, Torday found in the Kuba a sophisticated kingdom with a sumptuous artistic tradition, and in KotaPe an impressive ruler. Furthermore, the Kuba had a dynastic history which could be related to European chronologies: it was founded in the early seventeenth century, dated in oral tradition to a known passage of Halley's comet. In the Congo, the very heart of Conrad's ‘Heart of darkness’, Torday believed he had ‘discovered’ a kingdom on a parallel with European dynasties.  

On 17 March 1910, he married Gaia Rose Macdonald, a Scot, and on 19 February 1912, they had a daughter, the novelist Ursula Torday.

On 9 May 1931, he died of heart failure at the French Hospital Shaftesbury Avenue, at 55.

His work was recognised in 1910 when he was awarded the Imperial Gold Medal for Science and Art by the emperor of Austria.

In 2020 participants of the Budapest-Bamako charity rally named a school after him in Sierra Leone.

Bibliography
 On the ethnology of the South-Western Congo Free State (1907) (with Thomas Athol Joyce)
 George Grenfell and the Congo (1910) (with Harry Johnston and Lawson Forfeitt)
 Camp and tramp in African Wild (1913)
 The New Congo Collection (1913)
 On the Trail of the Bushongo (1925)
 Causeries Congolaises (1925)
 Descriptive sociology, or, Groups of sociological facts, classified and arranged by Herbert Spencer (1925) (with Herbert Spencer, David Duncan and Sir William Matthew Flinders Petrie)

References and sources

External links
 

1875 births
1931 deaths
Writers from Budapest
Hungarian anthropologists
Employees of the British Museum
Expatriates from the Austro-Hungarian Empire in the Belgian Congo